Dominique Fils-Aimé is a Canadian singer from Quebec, whose album Stay Tuned! was shortlisted for the 2019 Polaris Music Prize and won the Juno Award for Vocal Jazz Album of the Year at the Juno Awards of 2020.

Born and raised in Montreal to immigrant parents from Haiti, Fils-Aimé was a competitor in the third season of TVA's singing competition series La Voix in 2015. She was eliminated in the semi-final round by Matt Holubowski.

In 2018 she released Nameless, her debut album which explored blues music as the first installment in a trilogy devoted to the history of African-American music. Stay Tuned!, which explores jazz music, followed in 2019 as the second album in the trilogy. Her third album, Three Little Words, was released in 2021 and focuses on soul music. The album was shortlisted for the 2021 Polaris Music Prize.

In 2023, she participated in an all-star recording of Serena Ryder's single "What I Wouldn't Do", which was released as a charity single to benefit Kids Help Phone's Feel Out Loud campaign for youth mental health.

Discography

Studio Albums 

 Nameless (2018)
 Stay Tuned! (2019)
 Three Little Words (2021)

References

21st-century Black Canadian women singers
Canadian women pop singers
Canadian blues singers
Canadian women jazz singers
Canadian soul singers
Canadian rhythm and blues singers
Canadian people of Haitian descent
Singers from Montreal
Living people
Juno Award for Vocal Jazz Album of the Year winners
1984 births